The 2006 ARCA Re/Max Series was the 54th season of the ARCA Racing Series, a division of the Automobile Racing Club of America (ARCA). The season was scheduled to begin on February 11, 2006 with the Daytona ARCA 200 at Daytona International Speedway, but the race was delayed until February 12 because of rain. The season ended with the Prairie Meadows 250 at Iowa Speedway eight months later. Frank Kimmel won the driver's championship, his eighth in the series, while Blake Bjorklund won the Rookie of the Year award.

Schedule and results

Drivers' championship
(key) Bold – Pole position awarded by time. Italics – Pole position set by final practice results or rainout. * – Most laps led.
{|
| valign="top" |

External links
Official ARCA Website

ARCA Menards Series seasons
Arca Remax Series